"Love Walked In" is a song by English rock band Thunder, released in February 1991 as the last single from their 1990 debut album, Backstreet Symphony. The power ballad is the band's second highest-charting UK single, reaching  21 in February 1991.

Track listing
12-inch
A. "Love Walked In" (L.P. version)
B1. "Flawed to Perfection" (demo)
B2. "Until My Dying Day" (live)

Charts

References

1989 songs
1991 singles
1990s ballads
Thunder (band) songs
EMI Records singles
Rock ballads